Michael Francis Howley (September 25, 1843 – October 15, 1914) was a Roman Catholic priest. He was Bishop of St. John’s, Newfoundland from 1895 until 1904, when he was elevated to Archbishop of St. John’s, Newfoundland, a post he held until his death in 1914.

Family
Howley was a member of a distinguished Newfoundland family. His father, Richard, who had emigrated from Ireland in the early 19th century, was a successful merchant and civil servant. One of his brothers, Thomas Howley, became a doctor. Another brother, James Patrick Howley, was a geologist and author.

References

1843 births
1914 deaths
20th-century Roman Catholic archbishops in Canada
Roman Catholic archbishops of St. John's, Newfoundland
Pre-Confederation Newfoundland and Labrador people
Roman Catholic bishops of St. John's, Newfoundland
Roman Catholic bishops of Corner Brook and Labrador